East Bengal Club is an Indian association football club based in Kolkata, West Bengal, which competes in the top tier of Indian football. The club was formed in August 1920 when the Jorabagan Club's vice-president,  Suresh Chandra Chaudhuri, resigned. He did so after the club sent out their starting eleven with the notable exclusion of defender Sailesh Bose, who was dropped from the squad for undisclosed reasons when they were about to face Mohun Bagan in the Coochbehar Cup semi-final on 28 July 1920. He, along with Raja Manmatha Nath Chaudhuri, Ramesh Chandra Sen and Aurobinda Ghosh, formed East Bengal on 1 August 1920. East Bengal started playing in the Calcutta Football League, 2nd division, in 1921. In 1925, they qualified for the first division for the first time and since then they have won many Indian football titles.

East Bengal joined the National Football League (NFL) at its inception in 1996 and is the only club to have played every season to date, including those after the rebranded I-League succeeded the NFL in 2007. East Bengal won the National Football League in 2000–01, 2002–03 and 2003–04 and were runners up seven times, the most by any Indian football club. Among other trophies, East Bengal has won the Calcutta Football League 39 times, the IFA Shield 28 times, the Federation Cup eight times and the Durand Cup 16 times. The team has been one of the most successful in Indian Football. Since the independence of India, the club has attracted many foreign players and regularly featured big names from across the world, including some who have represented their nation at the FIFA World Cup.

This chronological list comprises all foreign players to have signed and played for the club since their foundation in 1920. Each players entry includes his nationality and season of first joining the club. There have been one hundred seventy five foreign players to play for East Bengal to date from forty-nine different countries, with thirty of them from Nigeria, the most from any single nation.

History

1920–1947: Pre-independence era 

Since the 1940s, the  East Bengal Club has had many foreign international players play for them. The earliest recorded foreign player was the prince of Nepal, Major General Madan Shumsher Jung Bahadur Rana, who donned the East Bengal jersey and played as a center-forward in an exhibition match against the Press Club Team on 4 July 1938. The first-ever foreign recruit to play a competitive match for East Bengal was Fred Pugsley of Myanmar, who joined East Bengal in 1942. Pugsley travelled  on foot from Burma after the Japanese invasion and reached Calcutta, where he knew only of the East Bengal club, which had toured Burma a few years back. The officials immediately recognised him. Extremely ill because of the inhuman exhaustion he suffered while running away from his country, a frail-looking Pugsley asked East Bengal club officials to allow him to try out for their team. The officials were hesitant at first, but after providing medical care, Pugsley tried out and became one of the greatest forwards to play for East Bengal. In the 1945 season especially, with Pugsley the top scorer in the league with 21 goals, East Bengal won the Calcutta Football League and IFA Shield double. Pugsley scored the solitary goal in the IFA Shield final against arch-rivals Mohun Bagan. He scored 48 goals for the club and holds the unique record of scoring eight goals in a single match against B.B & C.I. Railway on 23 September 1945 in the Rovers Cup match—the most goals scored by an individual in a single match in Indian football to date.

1947–1996: Post-independence era 

In the 50s, during the reign of Pancha Pandavas, East Bengal signed Pakistani internationals Masood Fakhri and Riasat Ali in 1952. During his first season with the club, Fakhri helped his side win the Calcutta Football League, DCM Trophy and the Durand Cup. Fakhri scored the winning goals in his first two matches against East Bengal's biggest rivals, Mohun Bagan, and became a fan favourite among East Bengal supporters. Fakhri was part of the East Bengal side to play tournaments and friendly matches in Romania and the Soviet Union. In 1953, the Pakistan Football Federation (PFF) prohibited Pakistani players from playing in India without a permit, but East Bengal still fielded Masood Fakhri and Niaz Ahmed, stating they had received permission from the PFF. On 3 October 1953, in the 1953 IFA Shield final against the Indian Cultural League (I.C.L.) on the third replayed final, Masood Fakhri scored for East Bengal and the game ended in a 1–1 tie. The I.C.L. team lodged a complaint with the Indian Football Association (IFA) immediately after the match  against East Bengal over their fielding the Pakistani players. On 11 October 1953, the IFA announced I.C.L. as the winners of the IFA Shield after East Bengal failed to produce a written permit for the Pakistani players from the PFF. The IFA suspended the East Bengal club from all football activities until 31 December 1954. East Bengal challenged this decision and took the IFA to court after receiving a letter from the PFF president, Dr. A. M. Malik on 25 October 1953, and had their suspension revoked. A few more Pakistani internationals like Abid Ghazi, Musa Ghazi, Hassan, Sumbal Khan, etc. played for the club in the mid-50s, with Musa becoming the first foreign player to score 100 goals in Kolkata football. Musa was the top scorer of East Bengal in 1956 and 1957 and scored a brace against Mohun Bagan in the 1957 Durand Cup final.

In the 60s and 70s, the club signed a handful of foreign players, including Selim Noor from Sri Lanka, who scored in his first match for the club against Mohun Bagan in the return leg of 1963 Calcutta League, Ruk Bahadur from Hong Kong and David Williams, the first Nigerian to play for East Bengal. In 1980, the club signed Iranian international Majid Bishkar, regarded as the greatest foreign player to play for East Bengal, who featured for the Iran national team in the 1978 FIFA World Cup alongside two other Iranians Jamshid Nassiri and Mahmood Khabaji. Majid became a fan favourite from his first appearance on 26 April 1980 against Hindustan Aeronautics Limited S.C. (HAL) in the Federation Cup, scoring one goal and assisting with another for Jamshid as he led East Bengal to their second Federation Cup title. He earned the nickname "Baadshah" and was voted the greatest foreign player to play for East Bengal in 2019. In 1986, East Bengal signed their first Brazilian player, the former Vitoria and Botafogo player Manilton S. Santos, and later signed Nigerian midfielder Emeka Ezeugo, who went on to play for the Nigerian national team and featured in the 1994 FIFA World Cup. Emeka was instrumental in leading East Bengal to the 1986 IFA Shield title, including a famous 3–1 victory against Nigeria's Leventis United in the semi-finals.

The club signed the most prolific forward to have played for East Bengal, Nigerian Chima Okorie from Mohammedan Sporting in 1987. He scored 131 goals for the club in three seasons, becoming the top scorer in East Bengal's history, surpassing K. P. Dhanaraj, who had 127 goals, until this was crossed by Bhaichung Bhutia. The club signed former Arsenal and Norwich City defender John Devine in 1987. In 1988, East Bengal signed former Argentine international Julian Camino, who featured for the Argentina national side in the 1983 Copa América.

East Bengal recruited four Bangladeshi internationals including the captain of the Bangladesh national team Monem Munna, along with Sheikh Mohammad Aslam, Rizvi Karim Rumi and Golam Mohammad Gaus in 1991. The club recruited three British players, Steven Alan Prindiville, Neil Edmonds and Peter Maguire for the 1991–92 Asian Cup Winners' Cup.

1996–2020: National League and I-League era 

In 1996-97, during the inaugural National Football League season, the club recruited Ulf Johansson from Sweden, Dev Narayan Chaudhary of Nepal, Chima Okorie, and Kelechi Okorie—Chima's younger brother and former AFC Bournemouth and Kenyan international Sammy Omollo. In 1997-98, East Bengal signed Kenyan forward Toni Jose Oniyenga—a cousin of Sammy Omollo and Kenyan international Haggi Azande Abulista, only the second foreign goalkeeper to play for the club till date after Balai Dey in 1965. Azande, alongside Sammy Omollo, featured in the Diamond Derby victory in the 1997 Federation Cup. Omollo scored the solitary goal as East Bengal snatched a victory against J-League side Verdy Kawasaki in the 1997–98 Asian Cup Winners' Cup.

In 1998, the club recruited three Ghanaians, Suley Musah, Jackson Egypong and Emmanuel Opoku, the latter a former Ghana national team player. Opoku played for two seasons, while Jackson and Musah played together till the 2000–01 season when East Bengal won their first National League title. Jackson and Musah formed one of the best defensive pairings in Indian football history. They conceded just nine goals in 22 matches as East Bengal lifted the National League title in the 2000–01 season. Jackson left after 2001, but Musah stayed and led East Bengal to a plethora of trophies between 2002 and 2004, with two back-to-back National League titles in 2002–03 and 2003–04. He captained the side to 2003 ASEAN Club Championship title as the Indian team won the country's first international football tournament by defeating Thailand’s BEC Tero Sasana 3–1;  Musah was the second foreign player to captain East Bengal club after Chima Okorie in 1990. During that period, the East Bengal club featured several Brazilian recruits like former Santos defender Douglas Silva, former Gremio forward Gilmar da Silva and former Vasco da Gama forward Cristiano Júnior, who became the top scorer with 15 goals as East Bengal lifted the 2003–04 National League title. In 2004–05, East Bengal signed Marcos Secco—brother of Douglas Silva—becoming the third foreign brother pair to play for the club.

In 2007–08, East Bengal recruited their third World Cup player, former South African international MacDonald Mukansi, who represented the Bafana-Bafana at the 2002 FIFA World Cup. The club also signed  Edmilson Marques Pardal, Julius Owino and Bolaji Majek during this period. The prolific Ghanaian duo Yusif Yakubu and Ishmael Addo signed with the club in 2008. Addo had represented the Ghana national team and was part of the Ghana U-17 and U-20 teams at the 1999 FIFA U-17 World Championship and 2001 FIFA World Youth Championship. Yakubu played for two seasons and led East Bengal to the 2009–10 Federation Cup title.

East Bengal signed former CAF Champions League winner Uga Okpara from Enyimba in 2009. He played for five seasons at the club, winning nine trophies including three Federation Cups. He was voted as the best defender of the 2012–13 I-League and played an instrumental role as East Bengal reached the semi-finals of the 2013 AFC Cup unbeaten. The club also acquired Tolgay Ozbey, Penn Orji, Chidi Edeh and James Moga during this period.

In 2014–15, East Bengal signed their fourth World Cupper, former New Zealand international Leo Bertos, who represented the New Zealand national team in the 2010 FIFA World Cup. The club signed the prolific Nigerian Ranti Martins who scored 47 goals for the club in two seasons, winning the Golden Boot in both the 2014–15 and 2015–16 I-League seasons. Former South Korean U-20 international Do Dong Hyun signed in 2015 and became a fan favourite during his short stay with the club after scoring four goals in the Kolkata Derby.  East Bengal signed former Paris Saint-Germain and France national team defender Bernard Mendy, who had previously represented the France national U-20 team in the 2001 FIFA World Youth Championship, for a brief spell in 2015–2016. East Bengal recruited former Syrian international Mahmoud Al Amna who had previously played for clubs like Al-Ittihad in 2017.

East Bengal signed their fifth World Cupper, Costa Rican international Johnny Acosta, in 2018. He represented the Costa Rica national team in the 2014 and 2018 FIFA World Cup. Acosta scored on his debut on 2 September 2018 in the Kolkata Derby and helped East Bengal to a 2–2 comeback in the Calcutta League. The club also recruited Enrique Esqueda, who was a U-17 World Cup winner with Mexico and represented the Mexico national team at the 2015 Copa America, and Spanish defender Borja Gomez Perez, who had previously played in the La Liga with Granada alongside another Spanish forward Jaime Santos Colado as they finished runners-up in the 2018–19 I-League. In January 2019, they roped in another former La Liga midfielder, Antonio Rodríguez Dovale, who had played for Celta Vigo. East Bengal recruited two more former La Liga players, Martí Crespí and Víctor Pérez, along with Spanish compatriots Juan Mera González and Marcos de la Espada in 2019.

2020–present: Indian Super League era 

The club joined the Indian Super League in 2020 and appointed former Liverpool Robbie Fowler as the manager and recruited former Premier League players like Anthony Pilkington and Danny Fox, along with EFL League One stars like Jacques Maghoma and Bright Enobakhare, and A-League players Scott Neville and Aaron Amadi-Holloway from Brisbane Roar and Matti Steinmann who had played for Hamburger SV in the Bundesliga. Matti Steinmann represented the German national U-20 team in the 2015 FIFA U-20 World Cup. Danny Fox became the third foreign player to be announced officially as the captain of the East Bengal club after Chima Okorie (1990–91) and Suley Musah (2003–04). In 2021–22 season, the club replaced all of the foreigners and announced the signings of Amir Dervišević, Tomislav Mrcela, Franjo Prce, Daniel Chima Chukwu, Darren Sidoel and Antonio Perošević. In the January window, the club had bought in three more players Marcelo Ribeiro, Francisco José Sota and Nepali international Ananta Tamang.

In 2022, the club after partnering with their new investors – the Emami group, announced the signing of five new foreigners for the season: three Brazilians — Alex Lima, Cleiton Silva and Eliandro, Spanish defender Ivan González and Cyprus national team defender Charalambos Kyriakou. East Bengal also signed Jordan O'Doherty from Australia as they completed the foreigner quota for the season.

List of all foreign players 

 

The list of all foreign players who have played for East Bengal as below:

Key
  Players with this background and symbol in the "Name" column denote individuals who were foreign citizen during the time they signed but later became Indian citizen.
  Players with this background and symbol in the "Name" column denote individuals who were signed by the club but were not registered into the squad.
A player name in bold signifies they have been capped by the national team.

Each player is mentioned only once, some of them have rejoined the club later again in different seasons but those entries are excluded from the list.

Players by nationality

Notes

References

External links
 Official website

East Bengal Club
Lists of association football players by club in India
Association football player non-biographical articles